The thenar eminence is the mound formed at the base of the thumb on the palm of the hand by the intrinsic group of muscles of the thumb. The skin overlying this region is the area stimulated when trying to elicit a palmomental reflex. The word thenar comes .

Structure
The following three muscles are considered part of the thenar eminence:
 Abductor pollicis brevis abducts the thumb. This muscle is the most superficial of the thenar group.
 Flexor pollicis brevis, which lies next to the abductor, will flex the thumb, curling it up in the palm. (The Flexor pollicis longus, which is inserted into the distal phalanx of the thumb, is not considered part of the thenar eminence.)
 Opponens pollicis lies deep to abductor pollicis brevis. As its name suggests it opposes the thumb, bringing it against the fingers. This is a very important movement, as most of human hand dexterity comes from this action.

Another muscle that controls movement of the thumb is adductor pollicis. It lies deeper and more distal to flexor pollicis brevis. Despite the name, adductor pollicis is chiefly responsible for rotation and opposition. This muscle is not in the thenar group of muscles, and is supplied by the ulnar nerve instead.

Nerve supply
The opponens pollicis and abductor pollicis brevis are normally innervated by the median nerve.

The flexor pollicis brevis has two heads a superficial and a deep.  The flexor pollicis brevis (FPB) is typically an ulnar-innervated muscle.  Due to a common interconnection between the median and ulnar nerves in the hand (Riche-Cannieu interconnection), the Median nerve may innervate the FPB in 35% of people.  It is innervated by the Ulnar nerve in 50% of people and by both the median and ulnar nerves in 15%.

The adductor pollicis is typically innervated by the ulnar nerve.   There are normal variations.  In a Cannieu-Riche anastomosis, fibers from the deep palmar branch of the ulnar nerve innervate the opponens pollicis and/or abductor pollicis brevis.  Regardless of their final innervation, the nerves that reach the thenar muscles arise from the C8 and T1 roots, pass through the lower trunk of the plexus, and then through the medial cord of the plexus.

The ulnar nerve is exclusively responsible for the innervations of the hypothenar eminence. Both nerves contribute to the innervations of the midpalmar group.

The muscles in this location are usually innervated by the recurrent branch of the median nerve. They all control movement of the thumb.

The innervation of these muscles by the median nerve is unusual, as most of the intrinsic muscles on the palm of the hand are supplied by the ulnar nerve. The lateral two lumbrical muscles are the other exception.

Additional images

See also
 Hypothenar eminence

References

External links
 

Hand
Muscles of the upper limb